The Clockarium is a museum in Schaerbeek, in the Brussels-Capital Region, Belgium, devoted to the Art Deco ceramic clock.

It specializes into the faience mantel clocks, which were the first timepiece affordable to everyone and proudly decorating many homes in Belgium and Northern France during the 1920s and 1930s. It is located on the Reyers boulevard in a stylish Art-Deco house built in 1935 by Belgian architect Gustave Bossuyt.

See also
 List of museums in Brussels

References

External links
 

Museums in Brussels
Schaerbeek
Houses in Belgium
Art Deco architecture in Belgium
Horological museums
2000 establishments in Belgium
Museums established in 2000